Cresta may refer to:

 Cresta, Gauteng, a suburb in South Africa
 CRESTA, Catastrophe Risk Evaluating and Standardizing Target Accumulations
 Cresta Awards, international advertising awards
 Cresta (soft drink)
 Vauxhall Cresta, an automobile model
 Toyota Cresta, an automobile model

See also
 Cresta Blanca Winery, a winery in Livermore Valley 
 Cresta Run, a sled run or track in St. Moritz, Switzerland
 Crest (disambiguation)
 Cresto (disambiguation)